Brian the Lion is a 2D side-scrolling platform game for the Amiga and Amiga CD32 developed by Reflections and published by Psygnosis in 1994. The player controls Brian, an anthropomorphic lion, who can defeat enemies by either clawing them or jumping on their heads.

References

External links
Brian the Lion at Lemon Amiga
Brian the Lion at Amiga Hall of Light

1994 video games
Amiga games
Amiga CD32 games
Psygnosis games
Side-scrolling platform games
Single-player video games
Europe-exclusive video games
Fictional lions
Video games about cats
Video games developed in the United Kingdom